Brooks Dodge (December 30, 1929 – January 17, 2018) was an American alpine skier. He competed at the 1952 Winter Olympics and the 1956 Winter Olympics. He graduated from Dartmouth College and Harvard Business School.

During his Olympic career he helped develop innovations in tighter ski wear and safer bindings for racers. In the 1950s,  Dodge was part of a team that started the development the Wildcat Mountain Ski Area, laying out and cutting some of the original trails.

References

1929 births
2018 deaths
American male alpine skiers
Olympic alpine skiers of the United States
Alpine skiers at the 1952 Winter Olympics
Alpine skiers at the 1956 Winter Olympics
People from Conway, New Hampshire
Sportspeople from Carroll County, New Hampshire
Dartmouth College alumni
Harvard Business School alumni